Calpella may refer to:

 Calpella, California
 Calpella mobile platform, a platform based on Intel Nehalem microarchitecture.
 A brachiopod genus, see Calpella (brachiopod).